Frank Johnson is an American former Negro league outfielder who played in the 1930s.

Johnson played for the Monroe Monarchs in 1932. In 11 recorded games, he posted two hits in 14 plate appearances.

References

External links
 and Seamheads

Year of birth missing
Place of birth missing
Monroe Monarchs players